Womack may refer to:

 H. Lynn Womack (1923–1985), US publisher, LGBT rights activist
 Womack, Missouri, a US unincorporated community
 Womack Army Medical Center at Fort Bragg (North Carolina)
 Womack & Womack, singing and songwriting partnership
 Womack (surname), people with the surname Womack
 Womack Development Company, a home construction company acquired by Lennar in 1973
 Womack Water, a small lake near Ludham in the Norfolk Broads